Vardar Metro Station is a station on the Sofia Metro in Bulgaria.  It opened on 28 January 1998.

Interchange with other public transport
 Tramway service: 8
 City Bus service: 45, 77
 Suburban Bus service: 56

Location

External links
 Sofia Metropolitan (Official site)
 Unofficial site
 360 degree panorama from outside the station (east end)

Sofia Metro stations
Railway stations opened in 1998
1998 establishments in Bulgaria